The following are the members of the Dewan Undangan Negeri or state assemblies, elected in the 2022 state elections which was part of the 2022 Malaysian general elections. Also included are the list of the Sabah state assembly members who were elected in 2020, Malacca state assembly members who were elected in 2021, Sarawak state assembly members who were elected in 2021, and Johor state assembly members who were elected in 2022.

Composition

Results of the 15th Malaysian general election (State)

Perlis

Kedah

Kelantan

Terengganu

Penang

Perak

Pahang

Selangor

Negeri Sembilan

Malacca

Johor

Sabah

Sarawak

See also
 Members of the Dewan Rakyat, 15th Malaysian Parliament

References

2022 elections in Malaysia
Lists of current office-holders in Malaysia